Guillermo Altadill (born 15 June 1962 in Barcelona) is a Spanish yachtsman. In addition to the Barcelona World Race, Altadill has also competed in 18 Atlantic crossings, six circumnavigations, 300,000+ miles sailed in competition, two Volvo Ocean Race (2001–02 with Assa Abloy and 2005–06 with Ericsson), and two Whitbread Round the World Race. He also was on board the maxi-catamaran Cheyenne when it set the Jules Verne’s record for fastest tour around the world with crew.

Altadill is a specialist on big ocean boats but has also achieved similar success in Laser dinghies and Olympic classes. He was the Spanish Champion in Soling and Tornado and the trainer of the Tornado Gold medalist at the 1996 Summer Olympics in Atlanta.

References

External links
 
 

1962 births
Living people
People from Barcelona
Spanish male sailors (sport)
Volvo Ocean Race sailors